is a Japanese grilled mutton dish prepared on a convex metal skillet or other grill. It is often cooked alongside beansprouts, onions, mushrooms, and bell peppers, and served with a sauce based in either soy sauce or sake.  The dish is particularly popular on the northern island of Hokkaidō and in China.

History

Jingisukan, originating from the Japanese transliteration of Genghis Khan, refers to a style of grilling mutton, which is also referred to as a type of yakiniku. The dish was conceived in Hokkaidō, where it has been a popular blue-collar dish that has only recently gained nationwide popularity. The name Jingisukan is thought to have been invented by Sapporo-born Tokuzo Komai, who was inspired by the grilled mutton dishes of Northeastern Chinese cuisine. The first written mention of the dish under this name was in 1931.

In 1918, according to the plan by the Japanese government to increase the flock to one million sheep, five sheep farms were established in Japan. However, all of them were demolished except in Hokkaido (Takikawa and Tsukisamu). Because of this, Hokkaido's residents began eating the meat from sheep that they sheared for their wool.

There is a dispute over from where the dish originated; candidates include Tokyo, Zaō Onsen, and Tōno. The first jingisukan dedicated restaurant was a  that opened in Tokyo in 1936.

Gallery

See also

 List of lamb dishes
 Mongolian barbecue
 Teppanyaki
 Yakiniku

References

External links

 Jingisukan, mutton barbecue - City of Sapporo
 Jingisukan barbecue restaurant

Japanese cuisine
Lamb dishes